Covenant Christian Academy of Colleyville, Texas, is a private Christian school that was founded in 1979. It is an accredited ACCS school and a member of the Texas Association of Private and Parochial Schools. Covenant Christian Academy is a non-denominational, classical, college preparatory Christian school serving students age 3 through grade 12. Pre-AP, AP, and Dual-Credit available.

History 
In 1979, Pastor Dale Smith of Colleyville Presbyterian Church and other faithful congregation members had a strong desire to start a school in Colleyville that would teach students from a Christian worldview. The vision became a reality in 1980 when six kindergarten students started class with their teacher, Helen Shepherd.

The following year, in 1981, classes for pre-kindergarten, first and second grades were added. Each year a grade level was added until 1992 when the first graduates of Covenant received their diplomas.

The classical approach to teaching was added to ourcollege preparatory standards in 1998.

Athletics
The athletic program has achieved 31 State Champion titles since 2005. As a TAPPS 4A school, they offer baseball, basketball, cheerleading, cross country, football, golf, soccer, swimming, track & field, and volleyball.

Fine Arts 
The fine arts department has enjoyed Betty Buckley awards, ACSI Gold Medals for speech, TAPPS art awards, and TPSMEA All-State Choir and Orchestra Members. Art, choir, strings, theatre, worship ensemble, video production, and yearbook are all offered as a part of their fine arts program.

References

External links
CCA Home Page

Christian schools in Texas
Colleyville, Texas
Private K-12 schools in Texas
Educational institutions established in 1979
1979 establishments in Texas
High schools in Tarrant County, Texas
Schools in Tarrant County, Texas